Aria can be a male or female name depending on the country of origin. In Sanskrit, though often transcribed "Arya",  means "noble" or "honorable". Italian  refers means both "air" and the melody, aria. In Albanian,  or  means "treasure" or "gold" or "of high value" It also means "lion" in Hebrew, and "noble" in Persian. In Persian, the name is used for males whereas in India, it is used as a male and female name.

People with the given name
Aria Aber, American poet and writer
Aria Barzan (Ariobarzanes of Persis, died 330 BC; known as Ariobarzane the Brave), Iranian prince and military commander
Aria Clemente (born 1995), Filipina singer and actress
Aria Crescendo, a French-Romanian singer, songwriter and member of the Paradiso Girls
Aria Curzon (born 1987), American actress
Aria de Vries-Noordam, Dutch Paralympic athlete
Aria Dean (born 1993), American critic, artist, and curator
Aria Finger, former CEO of DoSomething and President of the TMI agency
Aria Fischer (born 1999), American water polo player
Aria Giovanni (born 1977), American pornographic actress and model
Aria C Jalali!, San Francisco-based singer
Aria Johnson (born 1983), American singer and actress
Aria Sa'id (born 1989/1990), American transgender advocate and political strategist
Aria Tesolin (born 1993), Canadian singer
Aria Wallace (born 1996), American actress
Aria Wiraraja (died 1331), Asian warrior and monarch

Fictional characters
President Aria Pokoteng, from Aria (manga)
Aria Montgomery, a character from ABC Family's Pretty Little Liars, based on the series of books by Sara Shepard
Aria Blaze, in My Little Pony films
Aria Kanzaki, in the Aria the Scarlet Ammo series of novels
Aria Shichijou, in the Seitokai Yakuindomo manga series
Aria, in the video game Crypt of the Necrodancer
Aria Benett, in the video game Final Fantasy III
Aria, in the Guilty Gear series of fighting games
Aria T'Loak, from the Mass Effect series of video games
Aria Wallenstein, from the Sword Oratoria series of light novels
Aria Link, from the anime Tegami Bachi

People with the surname
Alphonse Aria (1902–1968), French sport wrestler
Kaminieli Aria (died 1967), Fijian cricketer
Mojean Aria, Australian actor
Nikita Aria, Indian actress

See also
Tata Aria, a car made by Tata Motors of India
Arias (surname)
Arya (name)

References

Hebrew-language given names